St. Matthew's Episcopal Church is an historic stone Episcopal church building located at 693 Southbridge Street in Worcester, Massachusetts. Designed by Stephen Earle of Earle and Fisher in the Gothic Revival style of architecture with some Romanesque details, it was built in 1894 by the Norcross Brothers.  Construction of the church was funded in part by Matthew Whittall, proprietor of the Whittall Mills.  It was the first Episcopal church in Worcester.

On March 5, 1980, it was added to the National Register of Historic Places as St. Matthews.

See also
National Register of Historic Places listings in southwestern Worcester, Massachusetts
National Register of Historic Places listings in Worcester County, Massachusetts

References

External links
 St. Matthew’s Episcopal Church website

Churches in Worcester, Massachusetts
Episcopal church buildings in Massachusetts
Churches on the National Register of Historic Places in Massachusetts
Gothic Revival church buildings in Massachusetts
Churches completed in 1894
19th-century Episcopal church buildings
Stone churches in Massachusetts
National Register of Historic Places in Worcester, Massachusetts